Marton is a town in the Shire of Cook, Queensland, Australia. The town is within the locality of Cooktown.

References

Shire of Cook
Localities in Queensland